Robert Jan (Rob) Mokken (born 28 April 1929) is a Dutch political scientist and Emeritus Professor of Political Science and Methodology at the University of Amsterdam.

Biography 
Born in Batavia, Dutch East Indies, Mokken began his studies at the Royal Netherlands Naval College in Den Helder from 1949 to 1952. He proceeded to study at the University of Amsterdam, where in 1957 he obtained his BA in Political and Social sciences, in 1961 his MA, and in 1970 his PhD with the thesis entitled "A theory and procedure of scale analysis: with applications in political research" under the supervision of Jan Hemelrijk.

In 1954 Mokken started as research assistant at the University of Amsterdam. From 1961 to 1966 he worked at the Centrum Wiskunde & Informatica. After another three years at the University of Amsterdam as a research assistant, in 1970 he was appointed Professor at the University of Amsterdam in Political and Social Science, and since 1979 in Political Science and Methodology. Among his about 20 doctoral students were Frans Stokman (1977), Robert de Hoog (1978), Willem Saris (1979), and Meindert Fennema (1981). In 1994 he retired, and is still working as an ICT consultant concerning statistical and quantitative methods.

Mokken published the book Theory and procedure of scale analysis, in 1971, in which he proposed a measure that was later named after him: the Mokken scale.

In 1990 Mokken was awarded a knighthood in the Order of Orange-Nassau.

Publications 
Mokken has published several books and many articles. A selection:
 1971. A theory and procedure of scale analysis with applications in political research
 1975. Graven naar macht: op zoek naar de kern van de Nederlandse economie. With H.M. Helmers, R.C. Plijter & F.N. Stokman.
 1997. Technologie en management: bestuursstructuren in industriële ondernemingens. With B.L. Icke and H. Disk.

References

External links 
 Robert J(an) Mokken profile, University of Amsterdam
 Prof. dr. R.J. Mokken, 1929 - at the University of Amsterdam Album Academicum website

1929 births
Living people
Dutch social scientists
Dutch political scientists
Royal Netherlands Naval College alumni
University of Amsterdam alumni
Academic staff of the University of Amsterdam
Knights of the Order of Orange-Nassau
People from Batavia, Dutch East Indies